Cofio may refer to:
 Cofio River, Spain;
 Cofio Software;
 Cofio Operating System;